Beáta Siti (born 23 September 1973) is a Hungarian former handball player, and later coach. During her active career she was European champion and silver medalist from both World Championships and the Olympic Games. Her biggest success with the national team was in 2000, when she obtained the gold medal at the European Championship.

Career
As a club player Siti has won all major continental trophies, including three EHF Cup, an EHF Cup Winners' Cup and an EHF Champions League title. Siti made her international debut on 25 November 1994 against Macedonia, and her first major tournament was the 1995 World Women's Handball Championship, where the Hungarian team won the silver medals after falling short against South Korea in the final. At the 1996 Summer Olympics in Atlanta she won a bronze medal with the Hungarian team, after losing for South Korea in the semi final, and winning the bronze final against Norway. In 1996 she also competed at the European Championships. At the 1998 European Women's Handball Championship in the Netherlands, she won a bronze medal with the Hungarian team. She participated at the 1999 World Championship where Hungary placed fifth. In the 2000 season she won a silver medal at the Summer Olympics in Sydney, after playing the final against Denmark. She competed at the 2000 European Women's Handball Championship, where the Hungarian team won gold medals ahead of Ukraine and Russia.

She was forced to retire in 2006 after a knee ligament injury, following that she took the technical director position of Alcoa FKC. Since 2011 beside her club duties she also works as the assistant coach of the Hungarian women's national team.

Personal life
She has a younger sister, Eszter Siti, who is also a former Hungarian international handball player and European champion.

Awards and recognition
Hungarian Handballer of the Year: 1998, 1999

Achievements

Club
Nemzeti Bajnokság I:
Winner: 1998, 1999
Magyar Kupa:
Winner: 1998, 1999, 2000
EHF Champions League:
Winner: 1999
EHF Cup Winners' Cup:
Winner: 1995
EHF Cup:
Winner: 1998, 2002, 2005
EHF Champions Trophy:
Winner: 1999

National team
Olympic Games:
Silver Medalist: 2000
Bronze Medalist: 1996
World Championship:
Silver Medalist: 1995
European Championship:
Winner: 2000
Bronze Medalist: 1998

References

External links
Beáta Siti career statistics on Worldhandball

Hungarian female handball players
Hungarian handball coaches
Olympic silver medalists for Hungary
Olympic bronze medalists for Hungary
Handball players at the 1996 Summer Olympics
Handball players at the 2000 Summer Olympics
Olympic medalists in handball
Expatriate handball players
Hungarian expatriates in Denmark
Fehérvár KC players
People from Nagykanizsa
1973 births
Living people
Medalists at the 2000 Summer Olympics
Medalists at the 1996 Summer Olympics
Sportspeople from Zala County